Gregory was Exarch of Ravenna from 664 to 677.

Gregory succeeded Theodore I Calliopas as Exarch. His tenure is mostly known for his support of the Archbishop of Ravenna in the latter's struggles with the papacy over the independence of the see. Also during his administration, the Byzantine emperor Constans II invaded southern Italy in an unsuccessful attempt to destroy the power of the Lombards. He was succeeded in 677 by Theodore II.

7th-century exarchs of Ravenna
7th-century deaths
Year of birth unknown